The 2019–20 Four Hills Tournament, part of the 2019–20 FIS Ski Jumping World Cup, took place at the four traditional venues of Oberstdorf, Garmisch-Partenkirchen, Innsbruck and Bischofshofen, located in Germany and Austria, between 28 December 2019 and 6 January 2020.

Results

Oberstdorf

 HS 137 Schattenbergschanze, Germany
29 December 2019

Garmisch-Partenkirchen

 HS 142 Große Olympiaschanze, Germany
1 January 2020

Innsbruck

 HS 128 Bergiselschanze, Austria
 4 January 2020

Bischofshofen

 HS 142 Paul-Ausserleitner-Schanze, Austria
 6 January 2020

Overall standings
The final standings after all four events:

References

External links 
 

2019-20
2019 in ski jumping
2020 in ski jumping
2019 in German sport
2020 in German sport
2020 in Austrian sport
December 2019 sports events in Germany
January 2020 sports events in Germany
January 2020 sports events in Europe